Darko Čordaš (born 16 December 1976) is a Croatian retired football player, who last played for NK Samobor.

Club career
Cordaš used to play for Pohang Steelers in South Korea, NK Posušje in Bosnia and Herzegovina, Neftchi Baku in Azerbaijan and NK Osijek, NK Grafičar Vodovod, NK Međimurje, NK Naftaš HAŠK, NK Kamen Ingrad, NK Vinogradar, HNK Trogir in Croatia.

He transferred to Shanghai Zobon in February 2010 and was released in July.

Personal life
Darko's father, Stjepan Čordaš, is a football manager.

References

External links
 
 
 Darko Čordaš at csldata
 

1976 births
Living people
Footballers from Osijek
Association football midfielders
Croatian footballers
Croatia youth international footballers
Pohang Steelers players
HŠK Posušje players
NK Osijek players
NK Grafičar Vodovod players
NK Međimurje players
Neftçi PFK players
Chongqing Liangjiang Athletic F.C. players
NK HAŠK players
NK Kamen Ingrad players
NK Vinogradar players
HNK Trogir players
Pudong Zobon players
NK Hrvatski Dragovoljac players
NK Samobor players
K League 1 players
Croatian Football League players
Azerbaijan Premier League players
Chinese Super League players
China League One players
Croatian expatriate footballers
Expatriate footballers in South Korea
Croatian expatriate sportspeople in South Korea
Expatriate footballers in Bosnia and Herzegovina
Croatian expatriate sportspeople in Bosnia and Herzegovina
Expatriate footballers in Azerbaijan
Croatian expatriate sportspeople in Azerbaijan
Expatriate footballers in China
Croatian expatriate sportspeople in China